Cecchi is an Italian surname. Notable people with the surname include:

Alberto Cecchi (born 1943), Italian rower
Anna Maria Cecchi (or Cechi; born 1943), Italian former swimmer
Carlo Cecchi (born 1939), Italian actor
Claire C. Cecchi (born 1964), American judge
Ezio Cecchi (born 1913), Italian cyclist
Gabriello Cecchi (1943-2000), Italian entrepreneurs, founder of the Gelati Cecchi
Gabriella Cecchi (born 1944), Italian pianist, music educator and composer
Giovanni Battista Cecchi (1748/9 - after 1815), Italian engraver
Giovanni Maria Cecchi (1518–1587), Italian poet, playwright, writer and notary
Stefano Cecchi (born 1971), record producer and founder of the Stefano Cecchi Records, Italian–British record label 
Suso Cecchi d'Amico (1914-2000), Italian screenwriter and actress
Rita Cecchi Gori (or Rusic; born 1960),  Croatian producer, actress and singer

Italian-language surnames